Jeff Miyahara (born February 4, 1977) is a Japanese-Korean record producer and songwriter based in Tokyo, Japan.

Beginning his career in the music industry in 1999, he has worked with many Japanese artists such as JUJU, Kana Nishino, Namie Amuro, TVXQ, Weather Girls,  as well as international artists like Boyz II Men, Girls' Generation, and Timbaland. He has accrued many Oricon rated No. 1 Digital Download hits, including "Kimi No Subete Ni" by Spontania ft. JUJU and JASMINE's "sad to say". He was awarded several Gold Disc Awards by the Recording Industry Association of Japan in 2005, 2008, 2009, and was titled Nikkei Entertainment's "Hitmaker of the Year" in 2010. He has sold over 40 million units to date.

In 2009, Miyahara signed a deal with UM360 (Universal Music 360, the management division of Universal Music Japan) after the success of his 2008 breakout hit "Kiminosubeteni", a hip-pop track he produced for Spontania featuring JUJU, which sold over 5 million digital downloads. In this year alone he was involved in the release of over 50 CDs. He currently has projects in the works with artists in the United States, Korea, Taiwan, Hong Kong, and Australia, while continuing his work in Japan.

Miyahara has cited his multi-cultural and multi-lingual background (LA-raised, half Korean, half Japanese) as the foundation on which his approach to songwriting and production is conceived.

Biography
During his teenage years Miyahara began playing guitar and was impressed both by heavy metal and the burgeoning MTV culture of mainstream music in the 1980s.

While Miyahara was still in school he developed his skills as a music producer. During this same period he traveled to Korea, where he became friends with other musicians of similar backgrounds and first began taking part in recording sessions as a producer.

In 1999, he commenced his full scale music career. In 2002, Miyahara released his first song as a producer, "Tsubasa wo kudasai", which was used as the theme song for Japan's national team in the 2002 FIFA World Cup, co-hosted by Japan and Korea.

Miyahara's breakthrough success came in August 2008 with the release of Spontania feat. JUJU's "Kiminosubeteni", which he produced. The song reached number 1 on the USEN chart, fourth in the yearly iTunes ranking :ja:君のすべてに and was downloaded over 5 million times. In 2009, another of Miyahara's productions, JUJU feat. JAY'ED "Ashitagakurunara" ranked No.1 on the Chaku Uta hit charts :ja:明日がくるなら

J-POP Music Group
Jeff's most recent initiative is the J-POP Music Group. J-POP Music Group is a team of top-tier (and Grammy Award-winning) writers, producers, engineers, and brand-builders. Chris Hart (musician) is an example among many of their projects. Jeff discovered Chris and with help from his J-POP Music Group, turned Chris into a polished, multi-award-winning, and purportedly 1.4 Million+ album-selling phenomenon.

Discography

Singles

Albums

DVDs

References

External links
 Official website

Record producers from California
Songwriters from California
Living people
1977 births
Universal Music Japan
Musicians from Los Angeles